István Moldován (Kolozsvár, 11 September 1911 – Budapest, 8 September 2000) was a Hungarian painter and graphic artist.

Life 
He started his studies of art at the Kolozsvár Fine Arts College in 1930, and continued from 1931 at the Hungarian Fine Arts College in Budapest. His masters were István Réti and István Szőnyi. In parallel to his studies in Budapest he also studied from János Thorma and János Krizsán at the Nagybánya artists' colony. In 1942 the Kolozsvár Transylvanian National Museum, held its annual "Art Week" and the "Kolozsvár in the Arts" competition, where he was awarded the second prize. The same year he also received a certificate of merit from the "Szinyei Merse Pál Association". In 1943 he received scholarship from Collegium Hungaricum Rome. From 1946 he exhibited his works mostly on Individual exhibitions in Hungary. Between 1948 and 1950 he worked in Transylvania, upkeeping himself from a scholarship. In Budapest, he lived at the famous Artist colony of Százados Road. He painted a lot, and also made graphics arts and mosaics.  His art pieces are part of the collection of the Hungarian National Gallery.

Individual exhibitions 

 1959 • Institute of Cultural Contacts, Budapest
 1960 • Nagykanizsa
 1963 • Kiskunfélegyháza
 1966, 1973 • Medgyessy Hall, Debrecen
 1969, 1975 • Munkácsy Hall, Békéscsaba
 1971 • Mednyánszky Hall, Budapest
 1973 • Gyöngyös
 1977 • Rudnay Hall, Eger
 1979 • Veszprém
 1955, 1962, 1981 • Csók Gallery, Budapest
 1983 • Miskolci Galéria, Szőnyi István Hall, Miskolc
 1984 • School Gallery, Csepel, Budapest
 1986, 1998 • Vigadó Gallery, Budapest

Assorted grouped exhibitions 
 1942 Art Week,  Transylvanian National Museum, Kolozsvár
 1942 Painting Tender of the St. István Week at Nagybánya, István Hotel
 1943 opening ceremony of Kolozsvár Arts Hall
 1950-1965 Hungarian Arts Exhibition 1-10.
 1957 Autumn Exhibition, Art Hall, Budapest
 1981 World of forests, Csontváry Hall, Pécs
 1988 Autumn Exhibition, Art Hall, Budapest
 1996 Paintings of Nagybánya art in private collections, Budapest Gallery, Budapest
 1998 Exhibition of the Százados Road Artist Colony, Pataky Gallery, Budapest
 2000 Honored be the master I. (exhibition of Szőnyi students), Szőnyi István Memorial Museum

Art-pieces in public space 
 Pedagogy College, Pécs (mosaic, 1964)
 Hospital of Salgótarján (mosaic, 1968)
 Nazareth, Basilica of Annunciation, southern wall, near a pillar (mosaic: Patrona Hungariae, 1969)
 Videoton Ceremonial Hall (mosaic, 1970, Székesfehérvár)

Notes 

Hungarian painters
1911 births
2000 deaths